is a passenger railway station located in the city of Shikokuchūō, Ehime Prefecture, Japan. It is operated by JR Shikoku and has the station number "Y25".

Lines
Akaboshi Station is served by the JR Shikoku Yosan Line and is located 85.9 km from the beginning of the line at Takamatsu Station. Yosan line local, Rapid Sunport, and Nanpū Relay services stop at the station.

Layout
The station consists of a side platform serving a single track. There is no station building, only a shelter on the platform for waiting passengers. The local municipality has built a waiting room and toilet by the side of the track where a bike shed has also been set up. A ramp leads up to the platform.

Adjacent stations

History
Japanese National Railways (JNR) opened Akaboshi on 1 March 1960 as a new station on the existing Yosan Line. With the privatization of JNR on 1 April 1987, control of the station passed to JR Shikoku.

Surrounding area
Japan National Route 11
Sanpuku-ji 
Shikokuchuo Municipal Nagatsu Elementary School

See also
 List of railway stations in Japan

References

External links
Station timetable

Railway stations in Ehime Prefecture
Railway stations in Japan opened in 1960
Shikokuchūō